The Roman Catholic Archdiocese of Patna is an archdiocese located in the city of Patna, in the state of Bihar (India).

History
 1917: Established as the Apostolic Vicariate of Patna from the Apostolic Prefecture of Bettiah
 10 September 1919: Promoted as Diocese of Patna
 16 March 1999: Promoted as Metropolitan Archdiocese of Patna

History Of The Archdiocese of Patna
The Congregation for the Propagation of Faith erected the Prefecture of Tibet - Hindustan in 1703 and entrusted it to the Capuchin Fathers of the Italian Province of Picenum in the Marches of Ancona. The first group of fathers reached Lhasa (Tibet) in 1707 and began Church work there. For nearly 41 years the Capuchin Fathers worked in Lhasa until a religious persecution forced them to give up their mission and move to Kathmandu (Nepal) in 1745.

Nepal had seen the Capuchin Fathers working with varying success in Kathmandu since 1715. A new conqueror of Kathmandu valley, Raja Pritvi Narayan, who was not sympathetic to the Fathers stopped all support to them. The Mission of Nepal was also abandoned in 1769, and the Fathers with 62 Nepalese Christians and five catechumens moved to India. The Nepalese Christians and catechumens settled down at Chuhari near Bettiah. The scene of the capuchin Mission shifted now to the Indian soil. Fr Joseph Mary ofm cap, a saintly priest, founded the Bettiah Mission in 1745 after the King of Bettiah, Raja Druva Singh had obtained permission from Pope Benedict XIV.

Rome erected the Prefecture of Tibet-Hindustan into a Vicariate in 1812. In 1827 an Independent Patna Vicariate was created, comprising Bettiah, Chuhari, Patna City, Dinapore, Bhagalpur, Darjeeling, Sikkim, Nepal, and adjacent territories. The saintly Anastasius Hartmann, was appointed its first Vicar Apostolic. With a Decree of Pope Leo XIII Patna Vicariate became a part of Allahabad diocese in 1886. The North Bihar Mission with its four stations of Bettiah, Chuhari, Chakhani and Latonah was entrusted to the Tyrolese Capuchins in 1886. In May 1892 the North Bihar Mission was made Bettiah - Nepal Prefecture with Fr Hilarion of Abtei, ofm cap, as its first Prefect. In 1919 this Prefecture was dissolved and joined to South Bihar to form the present Diocese of Patna.

Pope Benedict XV by a Decree on 10 September 1919 divided the Diocese of Allahabad into two. The Diocese of Patna was thus created. The Prefecture of Bettiah-Nepal was annexed to the new diocese. The Holy See entrusted Patna diocese to American Missouri Province of the Society of Jesus. Later, on 13 November 1930, after the division of Missouri Province, Patna diocese was entrusted to the Chicago Province of the Society of Jesus. Louis Van Hoeck, a Belgian Jesuit, was ordained the first Bishop of Patna on 6 March 1921.

The Third Order Regular (T.O.R.) Franciscan Fathers from Pennsylvania, USA came to Patna diocese to assist the Jesuits in 1938. The mission stations of Bhagalpur, Gokhla, Poreyahat and Godda were assigned to them. In 1956 Bhagalpur was made a Prefecture and in 1965 it was created a Diocese with Msgr Urban Mc Garry, T.O.R., as its First Bishop.

The forbidden Kingdom of Nepal was once again open for Fathers in 1951, thanks to the efforts of Fr. Marshall D. Moran, S.J. Nepal was made an independent ecclesiastical unit in 1984 and Fr. Antony Sharma, S.J. was appointed as its First Mission Superior.

On 28 March 1980, Pope John Paul II, accepted the resignation of Bishop Augustine Wildermuth S.J., and divided the Patna diocese into two units: Patna and Muzzaffarpur. Fr Benedict J Osta S.J., was appointed Bishop of Patna.

The Diocese of Patna comprises in the State of Bihar, the Districts of Patna, Nalanda, Nawadah, Gaya, Aurangabad, Rohtas, Jehanabad, Bhojpur, Bhabhua, Buxar and part of Munger.

Special churches
Pro-Cathedral:
St Joseph's Pro-Cathedral, Patna

Leadership
 Archbishops of Patna (Latin Rite)
 Archbishop William D’Souza, S.J. (1 October 2007 – present)
 Archbishop Benedict John Osta, S.J. (76) (16 March 1999 – 1 October 2007)
 Bishops of Patna (Latn Rite)
 Bishop Benedict John Osta, S.J. (76) (later Archbishop) (6 March 1980 – 16 March 1999)
 Bishop Augustine Francis Wildermuth, S.J. (12 June 1947 – 6 March 1980)
 Bishop Bernard James Sullivan, S.J. (15 January 1929 – 6 June 1946)
 Bishop Louis van Hoeck, S.J. (20 July 1920 – 15 February 1928)
 Vicars Apostolic of Patna (Latin Rite)
 Bishop Francis Pesci, O.F.M. Cap. (24 May 1881 – 1 September 1886)

Suffragan dioceses
 Roman Catholic Diocese of Bettiah
 Roman Catholic Diocese of Bhagalpur
 Roman Catholic Diocese of Buxar
 Roman Catholic Diocese of Muzaffarpur
 Roman Catholic Diocese of Purnea

Saints and causes for canonisation
 Ven. Anastasius Hartmann, Apostolic Vicar of Patna

References

External links
 GCatholic.org 
 Catholic Hierarchy 

Roman Catholic dioceses in India
Christian organizations established in 1917
Roman Catholic dioceses and prelatures established in the 20th century
Christianity in Bihar
1917 establishments in India
Patna